This was the first edition of the tournament.

Pedro Cachín won the title after defeating Marco Trungelliti 6–3, 6–7(3–7), 6–3 in the final.

Seeds

Draw

Finals

Top half

Bottom half

References

External links
Main draw
Qualifying draw

Open Comunidad de Madrid - 1